National Route 307 is a national highway of Japan connecting Hikone, Shiga and Hirakata, Osaka in Japan, with a total length of 103.7 km (64.44 mi).

References

National highways in Japan
Roads in Kyoto Prefecture
Roads in Osaka Prefecture
Roads in Shiga Prefecture